The Fauvel AV.29 was a design for a transport plane by Charles Fauvel in the late 1930s.

Design
The AV.29, a small two-engine tourism/transport aircraft, to be powered by two Régnier 4F.0 engines was also intended to be a flying scale model for the two-seat AV.29 C2 fighter (M for Maquette - model). The much larger AV.29 C2 two-seat fighter was planned to use either, 14-cylinder Gnome-Rhône 14M Mars radial engines or 12-cylinder Hispano-Suiza 12Y engines. However, the AV.29, in both forms, remained a paper project only.

Variants
Data from:Charles Fauvel and his Flying Wings
AV.29MProjected 4-seat tail-less touring aircraft powered by two Régnier 4F.0 engines
AV.29 C2Much enlarged  span two-seat fighter, to have been powered by a 14-cylinder Gnome & Rhône Mars radial engines or 12-cylinder Hispano-Suiza 12Y engine.

Specifications (AV.29M)

References

Tailless aircraft
1930s French aircraft
Fauvel aircraft
Twin-engined tractor aircraft